Carolyn L. Rose ( – ) was an archaeological conservator for the Smithsonian Institution and one of the first ethnographic conservators in the United States.

Early life and education 
Carolyn L. Rose (nee Rusch) was born on March 24, 1949 in Pittsburgh and raised in Washington, Pennsylvania. She was the daughter of The Reverend William G.and Ruth J. (Johnson) Rusch. She was married to Horace Rose and later to Dr. David von Endt.

Career 

She obtained a degree in art history from Sweet Briar College, and obtained her master's degree at George Washington University (GWU) in 1976.

She first interned as a student and then later started working for the Smithsonian as a conservation technician in 1972. She became a senior research conservator for the National Museum of Natural History in 1990. In 2000, she began her position as a chair woman at the Smithsonian Institution's anthropology department. Rose was also an adjunct associate professor at George Washington University since 1983. She created anthropological conservation, a  sub-discipline ethnography.

Rose was president of the Society for the Preservation of Natural History Collections (SPNHC) from 1994-1995. and the Washington Conservation Guild.

Awards and honors 
In 1992, Rose won the Rutherford John Gettens Merit Award for contributions to the American Institute for Conservation. In 1996 and 1998, she received Exceptional Service Awards from the National Museum of Natural History. Also in 1996, Rose  received the Award for Outstanding Service as President of SPNHC.

In 2001, Rose was awarded SPNHC's President's Award for distinguished service as President of SPNHC. In 2002, Rose was awarded SPNHC's Award for distinguished service and lifetime contribution to SPNHC's mission and values.

Rose was awarded the President's Medal at George Washington University.  George Washington University President Stephen Joel Trachtenberg described her as a "one-woman graduate school," due to having taught many ethnographic and archaeological conservators.

Death and legacy 
Carolyn L. Rose died of cancer on August 29, 2002 in Washington, D.C. She is survived by her husband, mother, siblings, daughter, and grandchildren. The Society for the Preservation of Natural History Collections' highest honor - SPNHC Award - was renamed in Carolyn Rose's honor. Dr.  Hanna M. Szczepanowska dedicated her 2012 textbook "Conservation of Cultural Heritage: Key Principles and Approaches" in memory of Carolyn Rose.

Publications 

 Examination and Stabilization of two Bull Mummies (1978)
 Protein Chemistry for Conservators (1984) Editor
 Ethical and Practical Considerations in Conserving Ethnographic Museum Objects (~1998)
 Storage of Natural History Collections : Ideas and Practical Solutions (1992)
 Preserving Natural Science Collections: Chronicle of Our Environmental Heritage (1993) - Preface

References

External links
  Rose's essay for the Getty Conservation Institute - "Conservation of Museum Collections"

Created via preloaddraft
Smithsonian Institution people
Sweet Briar College alumni
George Washington University alumni
Conservator-restorers
George Washington University faculty
1949 births
2002 deaths
20th-century American women
American women scientists
Museum people
People from Pittsburgh
Women conservationists